Cassius Chapin Cutler (December 16, 1914 – December 1, 2002) was an American electrical engineer at Bell Labs. His notable achievements include the invention of the corrugated waveguide and differential pulse-code modulation (DPCM).

Biography
He was born on December 16, 1914 in Springfield, Massachusetts to Paul A. Cutler and Myra Chapin. He received the B.S. degree in electrical engineering from Worcester Polytechnic Institute in 1937. On September 27, 1941 he married Virginia Tyler in Waterford, Maine.

In 1979 Cutler left Bell Labs to become a professor of applied physics at Stanford University.

He died on December 1, 2002, North Reading, Massachusetts.

Honors and awards
 IEEE Edison Medal, 1981
 IEEE Centennial Medal, 1984
 IEEE Alexander Graham Bell Medal, 1991 (with John O. Limb and Arun N. Netravali)
 member, National Academy of Engineering
 member, National Academy of Sciences
 Fellow, IEEE

References

External links
 Bio at the IEEE History Center
National Academy of Sciences Biographical Memoir – C. Chapin Cutler 1914–2002

1914 births
Members of the United States National Academy of Sciences
2002 deaths
People from Springfield, Massachusetts
Worcester Polytechnic Institute alumni
American electrical engineers
Scientists at Bell Labs
Stanford University Department of Applied Physics faculty
Fellow Members of the IEEE
IEEE Edison Medal recipients
Members of the United States National Academy of Engineering
IEEE Centennial Medal laureates
Engineers from Massachusetts
20th-century American engineers
American telecommunications engineers
Microwave engineers